National Conservatory may refer to:
 National Conservatory of Dramatic Arts of Paris
 National Conservatoire (Greece)
 National Conservatory of Music (disambiguation)